Mad Mel is a Canadian-born Australian former disc jockey.

Mad Mel may refer to:

Mel Gibson DUI incident